The bluebarred prickleback (Plectobranchus evides) is a species of marine ray-finned fish belonging to the family Stichaeidae, the pricklebacks and shannies. It is the only species in the monotypic genus Plectobranchus. This fish is found in the eastern Pacific Ocean.

References

Opisthocentrinae
Monotypic ray-finned fish genera
Taxa named by Charles Henry Gilbert